The 2013 European Junior Cup was the third season of the European Junior Cup, and the first to use Honda CBR500R bikes after using KTM 690 Duke bikes in 2012.

The series featured two female riders this year, Amélie Démoulin of France and Sabrina Paiuta of Brazil. The title was won by Jake Lewis from New Zealand.

Entry list

Race calendar and results

Championship standings

References

External links 

2013 in motorsport